Shareef' is a given name.  Notable people with the name include:

Shareef Abdelhaleem (born 1976), Egyptian terrorist
Shareef Abdul-Kadhim (born 1996), Iraqi footballer
Shareef Abdur-Rahim (born 1976), American basketball executive and former player
Shareef Adnan (born 1984), Jordanian footballer
Shareef Cousin (born 1979), American wrongfully convicted of murder
Shareef Miller (born 1997), American football player
Shareef O'Neal (born 2000), American basketball player
Shareef Zandani (1098–1215), Indian Sufi saint

See also
Shareef (surname)
Sherif, given name and surname